Alfredo Abelardo "Albee" Bantug Benitez (born December 20, 1966) is a Filipino-American businessman and politician serving as the City Mayor of Bacolod since 2022. He served three consecutive terms as the representative of Negros Occidental's 3rd district from 2010 to 2019. He was one of the richest congressmen in the Philippines.

Born and raised at Palo Alto, California, Benitez started his career on 2010 as a congressman. He was behind the concept of the weekend television show named Game Changer that was aired at the ANC.

On May 10, 2022, the COMELEC proclaimed  him as the new mayor of Bacolod.

Biography 

Benitez was born on December 20, 1966, in Palo Alto, California to Jose Conrado Benitez and Betty Bantug, both from Negros Occidental. He went to La Salle Green Hills for primary and secondary education. He then enrolled at the College of William & Mary in Williamsburg, Virginia and completed a mathematics degree.

Benitez is a former national athlete. He is a 1984 silver medalist in water skiing at the Southeast Asian Games. He is the founder of Betty Bantug Benitez Foundation, Inc., and Kaayong Lawas Foundation Hospital.

He resides in Victorias City, Negros Occidental together with his wife, Dominique Lopez, and their two children. He has also maintained residence in Bacolod.

Politics 
Benitez joined Philippine politics in 2010; he was elected congressman of the 3rd district of Negros Occidental and a representative at the House of Congress. He held a satellite congressional office at the City of Talisay. As a congressman, he helped draft and oversee the passing of the Sugarcane Industry Development Act, a piece of landmark legislation that supports sugarcane farmers. He also implemented a scholarship program.

He was also involved in the implementation of various projects in Negros Occidental, such as the Tourism Highway and Loop of Silay, upgrade and beautification of Bacolod-Silay International Airport roads, and the construction of other bridges and barangay hall buildings. He was also notable for his implemented of some house bills at the congress including House Resolution No. 5237, House Resolution No. 875, proposed admin capital city planning act, House Bill no. 85, House Bill no. 84, House Bill no. 82.

Benitez completed his three-term limit in 2019. His younger brother, Jose Francisco "Kiko" Benitez, was elected as his successor.

In June 2019, Negros Occidental governor Eugenio Jose Lacson appointed Benitez as the provincial government's consultant for economics and investments. He was serving pro bono.

In October 5, 2021, Benitez changed his voter address from Victorias to Bacolod and officially announced to run for Mayor of Bacolod against incumbent Mayor and rival Evelio Leonardia on May 9, 2022 elections. In March 26, 2022, Benitez formally launched his campaign, together with his slate known as Team Asenso or Grupo Asenso, a PDP-Laban led-coalition.

On May 10, 2022, the Commission on Elections declared Benitez as elected Mayor of Bacolod.

Business career 
Benitez is the majority owner and chairman of the gaming firm Leisure & Resorts World Corporation (LRWC). He also previously served as president of the said corporation.

Filmography 
Benitez made a guest appearances in shows and events at some films and television. His well-known television show was the Game Changer which is aired at ANC every Sunday. Benitez also guested in many interviews. He also founded and owns Brightlight Productions, one of the blocktime partners of Cignal Entertainment for TV5, which temporarily houses stars and talents of ABS-CBN and GMA Network.

Notes

References 

1966 births
Living people
People from Negros Occidental
21st-century Filipino politicians
College of William & Mary alumni
Members of the House of Representatives of the Philippines from Negros Occidental
Television series by Brightlight Productions